Strážný (until 1955 Kunžvart) is a market town in Prachatice District in the South Bohemian Region of the Czech Republic. It has about 400 inhabitants.

Administrative parts
Villages of Hliniště, Kořenný and Řasnice are administrative parts of Strážný.

Geography
It lies in the Bohemian Forest, most of the territory lies in the Šumava National Park and a smaller part lies in the Šumava Protected Landscape Area.

Two tributaries of the Vltava river, Řasnice and Častá, flow through the territory. The built-up area is located in the valley of Častá, below the Strážný mountain.

History
The first written mention of Strážný, then named Kunžvart, is from 1359, when existence of a castle on the Strážný mountain is documented. For 200 years it served to protect an important trade route and border of the Kingdom of Bohemia. Since 1547, the castle was uninhabited, and during the 16th century, it became a ruin. 

In 1689, a settlement was founded near the castle and named Kunžvart after the castle. The new village grew rapidly and already in 1833, the international road from Prague to Passau passed through here and one of the first bus lines in the country was in operation. In 1844, the village was promoted to a market town.

After the end of the World War II, in 1946 the German population was expelled.

Transport
There is the Strážný / Philippsreut road border crossing to Germany.

Sport
In Strážný, there is the Ski Resort Strážný.

Sights

The ruin of Kunžvart Castle in open to the public.

The Chapel of the Virgin Mary was built in 1834. It is accessible only once a year during Mass.

The most valuable building was the Church of the Holy Trinity from 1780. In 1965, it was demolished and the cemetery was moved. Today there is a place of reverence with a stone ground plan of the church on the site of the cemetery and a model of the church.

Notable people
Karl Hoschna (1876–1911), Austrian-American musician and composer

References

External links

Market towns in the Czech Republic
Populated places in Prachatice District
Bohemian Forest